Ìfé also spelt as Ife is a 2020 Nigerian LGBT romantic film executive produced by prominent Nigerian LGBTQ rights activist Pamela Adie and directed by Uyaiedu Ikpe-Etim. The film is touted to be the first full fledged lesbian film in the history of Nollywood. However some sources stated that it is also the first Nigerian LGBT film.

The film revolves around the lives of a same sex women couple who also face challenges by being lesbians in Nigeria. With the release of the official trailer of the film on YouTube in July 2020, the film is expected to be released via internet possibly at the end of the year. The film raised concerns and publicity among Nigerians for the film genre coupled with the trailer reception.

Cast 

 Cindy Amadi
 Uzoamaka Aniunoh

Production 
It was revealed that the script was penned as a romantic story between two females and the project was initiated jointly by Uyai Ikpe-Etim and Pamela Adie in collaboration with the Equality Hub, an NGO which operates in Nigeria focusing on LGBT rights. The film was set to break the stereotypes faced by the Nollywood industry which historically failed to live up to the expectations of portraying the LGBTQ elements.

Censorship 
The film dealt with censorship issues during its production phase due to its genre related to LGBTQ.
the film production and principal photography was not meant to be smooth for the filmmakers due to the interference of National Film and Video Censors Board which threatened and refused to approve the film for the theatrical distribution. Prior to the release of the official trailer in July 2020, it was noted that the film was not submitted by the filmmakers to the NFVCB.

The theatrical interpretation of LGBT in Nigeria is regarded to be controversial. The same sex relationship is considered as a serious offense in Nigeria and a punishment of 14 years imprisonment is imposed if found guilty. The Same Sex Marriage (Prohibition) Act of 2014 was passed by former President Goodluck Jonathan which terms same sex marriages and LGBT as illegal.

Adedayo Thomas, the executive director of NFVCB in an interview with CNN insisted that the Board would not approve films which promote themes and portrayal of elements that do not conform with Nigeria's values, beliefs, morals, traditions and constitution. The NFVCB also issued warnings and threats stating that it would track the LGBT filmmakers in Nollywood following the production of Ife.

Release 
Though the film wasn't banned officially by the NFVCB, the film is scheduled to be released via online platforms instead of a theatrical release as to avoid the censorship issues and due to the uncertainties due to the COVID-19 pandemic in Nigeria. The filmmaker Adie revealed that the film will not be streamed via YouTube and revealed that the film would be streamed through their own platforms.

References 

2020 films
Nigerian romantic drama films
English-language Nigerian films
2020s English-language films
Yoruba-language films
Nigerian LGBT-related films
LGBT-related romantic drama films
Lesbian-related films
2020 LGBT-related films